MISG may refer to:
 The Mathematics in Industry Study Group, an annual workshop now held in Australia, under the wing of Australian and NZ Industrial Applied Maths ANZIAM
 Malaysian Islamic Study Group, a U.S.-based student organization
 Military Intelligence and Security Group, the former secret police agency of the Philippines